Beulah, a feminine given name, originated from the  Hebrew word ( bə‘ūlāh), used in the Book of Isaiah as a prophesied attribute of the land of Israel. The King James Bible transliterates the word and translates it as "married" (see ). An alternative translation is "espoused", see for example  (Mechon Mamre). The Online Etymology Dictionary relates the word to baal, meaning "owner, master, lord".

Literary works have used "Beulah" as the name of a mystical place, somewhere between Earth and Heaven. It was so used in The Pilgrim's Progress by John Bunyan and in the works of William Blake, for example several times in The Four Zoas.

People with this name
Beulah Annan (1899–1928), American suspected murderer and the model for the character Roxie Hart (from Chicago)
Beulah Bewley (1929–2018) British public health physician
Beulah Bondi (1888–1981), American actress
Beulah H. Brown (1892–1987), American artist
Beulah Burke (1885–1975), co-founder of Alpha Kappa Alpha, the first sorority founded by African American women
Beulah Marie Dix (1876–1970), American screenwriter and author of children's books
Beulah Gundling (1916–2003), American synchronized swimmer
Beulah Louise Henry (1887–1973), American inventor
Beulah Elfreth Kennard (1869-after 1944), American Trades Union activist
Beulah McGillicutty, stage name of Trisa Hayes Laughlin (born 1969), American pro wrestling valet
Beulah Poynter (1883–1960), American actress and writer
Beulah Quo (1923–2002), Chinese-American actress and activist
Beulah Thumbadoo, South African literacy campaigner
Beulah Rebecca Hooks Hannah Tingley (1893–1986), Florida politician
Beulah Woodard (1895–1955), American sculptor
Beulah Woolston (1828–1886), pioneering American missionary teacher in China

Fictional characters
Beulah Brown, the title character of the 1940s and '50s radio and television series Beulah
Beulah McInnerny, a minor character from the animated children's series Arthur
Beulah is the middle name of Jackie Burkhart from That '70s Show
Beulah Bleak, from Grant Morrison's comics Seven Soldiers: Klarion the Witch-boy
Beulah Lisa Wilkes, Will's girlfriend and onetime fiancée in The Fresh Prince of Bel-Air. She always went by her middle name.
Beulah Bemis, a main character and narrator of the book “One for the Blackbird, One for the Crow”
Beulah is the name (and spelling) given for the particular machine used by Jake Sully to establish the neural connection between himself and his avatar in the movie Avatar.

See also
 Beulah (disambiguation)
 Beulah (Blake)

References

Hebrew feminine given names